Psichotoe is a genus of moths in the subfamily Arctiinae.

Species
 Psichotoe cingulata Kiriakoff, 1963
 Psichotoe duvaucelii Boisduval, 1829
 Psichotoe rubridorsata Berio, 1941

Former species
 Psichotoe gnatula Boisduval, 1847

References

 Natural History Museum Lepidoptera generic names catalog

Arctiinae